Below Her Mouth is a 2016 Canadian erotic romantic drama film directed by April Mullen and written by Stephanie Fabrizi. The film stars Natalie Krill as Jasmine and Erika Linder as Dallas, two women in Toronto who meet and begin a passionate love affair. The cast also includes Tommie-Amber Pirie, Mayko Nguyen, Elise Bauman, Melanie Leishman, and Sebastian Pigott.

Plot

While having sex with her girlfriend Joslyn, a roofer named Dallas finds herself sexually frustrated by not being able to fully have an orgasm while Joslyn has a massive one. Despite Joslyn's pleas, Dallas breaks up with her. Meanwhile, Jasmine, a successful fashion designer, is happily engaged to a man named Rile. He leaves her behind while going on a business trip. Later that night Jasmine, despite claiming to be straight, goes to a lesbian bar with her friend Claire, to be her wing woman. While in the bar's bathroom, Jasmine meets Dallas who finds herself to be immediately attracted to Jasmine.

Dallas soon hits on Jasmine, despite the latter telling her that she's engaged and tries to excuse herself to find Claire, only to find that her friend is already dancing and making out with another woman. Jasmine leaves, only to have Dallas follow her and make out with her. While Jasmine initially resists, it soon becomes consensual, and she kisses Dallas back before finally stopping and making Claire leave with her. Claire tells Jasmine not to worry about the kiss. The next morning after Dallas leaves for work, it is shown that she is currently working on roofing the house next to Jasmine's. Jasmine soon starts to find herself attracted to Dallas as well; she starts to masturbate to Dallas in her bathtub after seeing her from her window.

Although Jasmine rejects Dallas once again while on her way to work, seeing a naked woman model for her soon awakens a lust for Jasmine that makes her finally admit defeat and agrees to have one date with Dallas. In a bar, Dallas tries to get intimate with Jasmine, who despite her best attempts to resist, soon makes out with Dallas in an alleyway but then asks Dallas to take her somewhere else once she sees a garbageman near them. Dallas takes Jasmine back to her apartment where the two engage in passionate sex, after which Jasmine starts to cry after realizing she has cheated on her fiance, but is soon comforted by Dallas. After waking up in the morning, Jasmine receives a call from Rile and while initially feeling guilty, decides not to tell him what has happened. After hanging up, Dallas and Jasmine start to get to know each other more with Dallas telling her how she became a roofer and Jasmine revealing that she once had feelings for another girl when she was younger, but decided not to pursue this after her mother found out. While spending the day together Jasmine reveals how she once had an amazing opportunity in her career, but turned it down as it would have required her to move; she had sacrificed it for Rile who also gained a similar chance with his work, to which Dallas tells her she would have moved with Jasmine if they were in a relationship.

The next morning, the two women again have passionate and urgent sex since Rile will be returning the day after. While dropping Jasmine back home, Dallas attempts to have sex one last time since Jasmine tells her they won't be able to see each other after that night. Jasmine's best efforts to resist this fail, and she succumbs. Meanwhile Rile calls Jasmine to inform her that he is coming home after a rainstorm caused his trip to be cancelled early, but she is too engaged in having sex with Dallas to notice his message. Jasmine and Dallas move their lovemaking to the bathroom and after a while Rile walks in on them. Rile leaves, with Jasmine chasing after him while Dallas goes back home. Rile agrees to forgive Jasmine if she breaks up with Dallas for good, which she does after sharing a heartbreaking farewell and a last kiss. In the days that follow, the two women are shown to be miserable without each other as Dallas is once again sexually frustrated even after having an erotic encounter with a stripper and Jasmine cries when Rile attempts to have sex with her, knowing that she will never be the same fiancée for him, ever again.

Sometime later Dallas and Jasmine meet up where they reconcile as Jasmine reveals she told her friends everything about Dallas.

Cast

Production
The film was shot in Toronto over a period of three and a half weeks in 2015 with an all-female production crew, and subsequently premiered at the 2016 Toronto International Film Festival, followed by a simultaneous release in the United States on April 28, 2017.

Critical reception 
The film received generally negative reviews from critics.  

Diego Semerene of Slant Magazine gave the film 0.5 stars out of 4, writing, "The film is an unquestionably pornographic fantasy barely trying to pass as something other than masturbation material." He added, "Below Her Mouths stiff acting and dialogue suggest a misguided Blue Is the Warmest Color influence reduced to the sexy aesthetics of lesbian sex but completely oblivious to that which actually animates the film's impossibly beautiful, unbearably smooth, and perpetually horny bodies." Guy Lodge of Variety described it as "a sexually frank but narratively flimsy girl-meets-girl romance that never gets under its gorgeous characters' amply exposed skin." Frank Scheck of The Hollywood Reporter called it "an undeniably steamy effort that delivers plenty of heat in its sex scenes, while falling significantly short in dramatic terms."

Katie Walsh of the Los Angeles Times said: "Despite the female filmmakers at the helm, the film treads into exploitative territory, with the ratio of screen time given to writhing female bodies far outweighing that given to their unique experiences as gay or closeted women in the world." Jude Dry of Indiewire wrote: "What, exactly, is below her mouth? Her chin? Her body? Her entire mind and spirit? It's a fittingly ambiguous title for a directionless film, late night fare that will be enjoyed by just as many horny men as horny teenage lesbians."

Home media
The film was made available as video on demand on Amazon Video on April 29, 2017; followed by Netflix on August 1, 2017.

See also
 List of LGBT-related films directed by women

References

External links 
 

2016 films
2016 LGBT-related films
2016 romantic drama films
2010s English-language films
2010s erotic drama films
Canadian erotic drama films
Canadian LGBT-related films
Canadian romantic drama films
English-language Canadian films
Erotic romance films
Films directed by April Mullen
Films set in Toronto
Lesbian-related films
LGBT-related romantic drama films
2010s Canadian films